The Five Year Plan was an Argentine state-planning strategy, during the first government of President Juan Domingo Perón.

First Five Year Plan (1947–1951)

Preparations 
Early in the second half of 1946, the Technical Secretariat of the Presidency began to prepare a Plan of Government for the five-year period from 1947 to 1951. The Five Year Plan was first announced as a bill to be sent to the Congress, in the presidential message of October 19, 1946 (the Article 1º consisted of the "Achievements and Investment Plan", and developed a number of other bills).

The plan addressed the need to anticipate and encode in a single body all the measures affecting the exports and imports, regulating the classification, packaging and quality certification of the exportable products, and establishing a customs procedure tailored to the current situation at that time. It decentralized and diversified industry, forming new productive areas, and placing them properly in terms of natural energy sources, means of communication, transportation and consumer markets. A minimum of five years was established for works and investment needed to ensure an adequate supply of raw materials, fuel and mechanical equipment, and rationally develop industry and agriculture in the country. Moreover, in order to expedite customs and port services, it was proposed to unify in each office those functions under the direction, coordination and oversight of a central body to be known as the General Administration of Customs and Ports of the Nation which would replace -with more powers- to the hitherto General Directorate of Customs.

In its article 2 º, it authorized the Executive to fund the plan with the issue of Public Debt Securities in the amount required and / or any other appropriate means, rendering annually to Congress.

The making knowledge was new: both houses of the Congress were convened, not formally as House, but as an invitation to national senators and representatives to join the exposure of the President. The event took place in the floor of the House of Deputies on October 21, 1946, with full attendance for the ruling bloc, however the opposition failed to attend. The event was opened by the Senate President and Vice President of the Nation, Dr. Juan Hortensio Quijano; and later Perón and the Technical Secretary, barcelonan Dr. José Figuerola.

The government opened an outreach campaign, beginning with talks of President Juan Perón in the Teatro Colón, first with workers, and then with employers of the Argentine Industrial Union and the newly created Argentine Association of Production, Industry and Trade.

Second Five Year Plan (1951–1955) 
 
The Second Five Year Plan was based on encouraging the growth of the heavy industry. It was held in 1952, during the second term of Juan Domingo Perón (1951–1955).

Measures 
During this period, Perón stressed primarily to promote foreign investment in the Argentine trade. The main measurements were:

 Increase foreign investment
 Growth of heavy industry
 Removes most of the subsidies and industrial loans
 Partial restriction of public consumption
 The IAPI (Argentine Institute for the Promotion of Trade) would buy crops at a lower price than the international ones, for obtaining resources and stimulating industrialization.

Economy 
The state took over the tasks of selling the exportable surpluses of domestic production, and purchasing fuel, raw materials and capital goods required for agricultural, industrial and mining development in the country.

Argentine Institute for the Promotion of Trade 
The Argentine Institute for the Promotion of Trade (IAPI) was an Argentine public body created by the decree nº 15350 on May 28, 1946, that, although it was signed by President Edelmiro Farrell, it was part of the package that Colonel Juan Domingo Perón and his team of advisers had projected, operating under the aegis of the Central Bank, in order to centralize foreign trade and transfer resources between different sectors of the economy. Its director was the economist Miguel Miranda, chairman of the Central Bank.

Objectives 
The objective that guided the creation of this agency was the need to have an agency specialized in trade issues, a better external integration through the conquest of new markets, and the consolidation of Argentina's presence in those already obtained. It also sought to promote the quality and diversity of local products and create strategies to defend their prices in the international market against the eventual deterioration of the terms of trade; protecting domestic producers against the changes in international prices, and against the action of international monopolies and importing countries of Argentine products.

Features 

The body had different functions. At the commercial level, it was responsible for buying cereals and meat to the producers, and then export them when international prices were favorable. Also met financial functions, providing funds to certain public agencies, provincial governments and even to the private sector for the acquisition of capital goods. 
When the Institute acquired processed products which failed placement, it provided the profit margin for the industrial sector, creating a special joint committee to resolve the crisis in certain productive sectors, acquiring raw materials to give it to manufacturers.
Also developed promotion and development functions, as determined which production activities were a priority and therefore should receive special treatment, for example, the granting of credits without obligation to repay. On the other hand, it subsidized the production of certain consumer goods in order to maintain the level of real wages.

Results 

Trade agreements were reached with several countries. Between 1947 and 1949 reached trade agreements with Switzerland, Hungary, Italy, the Netherlands, Norway, Finland, Denmark, Brazil and Sweden. Despite the efforts made by the body to expand the portfolio of buyers of Argentine products, the United Kingdom continued to rank first as an importer, followed by the United States.

Concerning imports, the importance of IAPI was significantly lower. The major purchases were recorded in the areas of metallurgy, building materials, machinery and textiles, standing out as sellers United States and Great Britain, while trade with the Soviet Union reported a significant increase since 1953.

Decline 
The international decline in agricultural prices that followed the post-war European recovery, largely cut off the genuine source of income of the IAPI.

Since 1949 the institute's activities dwindled, leading to the private sector take over much of the exchange. In its relations with the private sector, the large subsidies granted IAPI: between 1947 and 1954 agricultural subsidies amounted to 5,063,011 pesos, while the livestock sector amounted 4,567,590 pesos.

Finally, the deficit turned out to be important enough to motivate the redesign of its convenience (in its latest report the agency's operating deficit amounted to 20,000 million pesos or 3% of the GDP of that time).

History of Argentina (1943–1955)
Economic history of Argentina
Five-year plans